Penshurst is a village in Kent, England
Penshurst Place, a historic building in that village
Penshurst Airfield, an airfield and RAF base in the early 20th century

Penshurst may also refer to:
Penshurst, New South Wales, a suburb of Sydney, Australia
Penshurst, Victoria, a town in Australia
, a WWI Q-ship

See also 
Penhurst, a village in East Sussex, England